The Ministry of Integration and Regional Development (abbreviated MIDR) is a cabinet-level federal ministry in Brazil, established in 1999. On January 1, 2019, the Ministry of National Integration and the Ministry of Cities were merged and transformed into the Ministry of Regional Development. It was recreated on January 1, 2023.

Responsibilities 
The ministry oversees following responsibilities:

 Formulate and conduct the integrated national development policy
 Formulate regional development plans and programs
 Establish integration strategies for regional economies
 Establish guidelines and priorities in the application of resources from financing programs referred to in the Federal Constitution
 Establish guidelines and priorities in the application of resources from the Amazon Development Fund and the Northeast Development Fund
 Establish norms for compliance with the financing programs of constitutional funds and the budgetary schedules of regional investment funds
 Monitor and evaluate integrated national development programs
 Civil defense
 Works against droughts and water infrastructure
 Formulate and conduct the national irrigation policy
 Public works in border strips

References

External links
 Official site

Integration and Regional Development
Brazil, Integrationand Regional Development